Yablonovsky (masculine), Yablonovskaya (feminine), or Yablonovskoye (neuter) may refer to:

Yablonovskoye Urban Settlement, several municipal urban settlements in Russia
Yablonovsky (inhabited locality), several inhabited localities in Russia

See also
Jabłonowski